TSAGEM is a ward head in Mani Local Government, Katsina State. It is situated on the northern part of Mani town. It is a predominantly Fulani village whose main occupation is farming and animal rearing. It has its indigenes scattered all over Nigeria engaging in one job or another. They are educated in both western and Islamic education. 
It has an area of 42 km and a population of 766 at the 2006 census.
Abubakar Abdulkarim Tsagem is born in tsagem
The postal code of the area is 823.

References

Local Government Areas in Katsina State